Brandon Graham (born 1976 in Oregon) is an American comic book creator.

Biography
Born in Oregon, Graham grew up in Seattle, Washington, where he was a graffiti artist. He wrote and illustrated comic books for Antarctic Press and Radio Comix, but got his start drawing pornographic comics such as Pillow Fight, Perverts of the Unknown and the initial issue of Multiple Warheads (Warheads would go on to become an ongoing, more mainstream comic published by Oni Press in 2007). In 1997, he moved to New York City where he found work with NBM Publishing and became a founding member of comics collective Meathaus. His book Escalator was published by Alternative Comics in January 2005, when he returned to Seattle. His book King City was published by Tokyopop in 2007 and was nominated for an Eisner Award. In May 2009 Graham announced that King City would continue publication at Image Comics and his Oni Press title Multiple Warheads would resume publication after a delay, this time in color. 

At Image he led the revival of Prophet, a sci-fi reboot of Rob Liefeld's 1990s series, with a rotating roster of artists including Giannis Milonogiannis, Farel Dalrymple, and Simon Roy.

Bibliography

Early work
October Yen #1-3 (w/a, Antarctic Press, 1996)
A-Bomb vol. 2 #1: "Blueprints" (w/a, anthology, Anthill, 1999)
Meathaus #4-8 (w/a, anthology, Meathaus Press, 2001–2006)
Radio Comix:
Milk! #7: "Paris Paris" (w/a, anthology, 1998)
Universe So Big #1-2 (w/a, 1999)
Mangaphile (w/a, anthology):
 "Gone Fishin" (in #13, 2001)
 "True Crime" (in #14, 2001)
Sizzle (w/a, anthology, NBM Publishing):
 "Perverts of the Unknown" (in #13-15, 2002) collected as Perverts of the Unknown (tpb, 64 pages, Eurotica, 2003)
 "Multiple Warheadz" (in #18, 2003) collected in Complete Multiple Warheads (tpb, 208 pages, Image, 2013)
 "Pillow Fight" (in #24-28, 2004–2005) collected as Pillow Fight (tpb, 48 pages, Amerotica, 2006)
Heavy Metal Sci-Fi Special #2: "Devil and the Deep" (w/a, HM Communications, 2004)

Image Comics
24Seven Volume 1: "Fire Breathing City" (w, with James Stokoe, anthology graphic novel, tpb, 224 pages, 2006)
Popgun Volume 2: "Sputz" (w/a, anthology graphic novel, tpb, 472 pages, 2008)
Tokyopop Presents: King City #1-12 (w/a, 2009–2010) collected as King City (tpb, 424 pages, 2012)
Prophet (w/a, with Simon Roy, Farel Dalrymple, Giannis Milonogiannis, Ron Ackins and others, Extreme Studios, 2012–2015) collected as:
 Remission (collects #21-26, tpb, 136 pages, 2012)
 Brothers (collects #27-31 and 33, tpb, 172 pages, 2013)
 Empire (collects #32 and 34-38, tpb, 128 pages, 2014)
 Joining (collects #39-45, tpb, 168 pages, 2015)
 Earth War (collects Strikefile #1-2 and Earth War #1-6)
Multiple Warheads (w/a):
 The Complete Multiple Warheads (tpb, 208 pages, 2013) collects:
 Alphabet to Infinity #1-4 (2012–2013)
 Down Fall (one-shot collection of all previously published short stories, 2013)
 Multiple Warheads Vol. 2 (tbp, 128 pages, 2018, ISBN 1-5343-0676-5) collects:
Entries from Island issues #1, #4, and #15
Ghost Throne (w/a, 2018) single issue, final chapter completed the serialized story arc that began in Island
The CBLDF Presents Liberty Annual '12: "King Kim: Barlartan Revenge" (w/a, anthology, 2012)
Thought Bubble Anthology #3: "One Night in Comicopolis" (w/a, with Cameron Stewart, 2013)
8HOUSE #1-ongoing (w, shared-universe/anthology series spearheaded by Graham, 2015–...)
Island #1-15 (w/a, anthology series featuring various artists from around the world edited by Graham and Emma Ríos, 2015–2017)
The Wicked + The Divine #17 (a, with Kieron Gillen, Jamie McKelvie and Matt Wilson, 2015)
Royal Boiler (w/a, collection of various art, 248 pages, 2018)
Rain Like Hammers #1-5 (w/a, 2021)

Other publishers
Oni Press:
Multiple Warheads #1: "The Fall" (w/a, 2007) collected in Complete Multiple Warheads (tpb, 208 pages, Image, 2013)
Resurrection vol. 2 #5: "Under" (w/a, co-feature, 2009)
Arcana Studio Presents #6: "Creepsville" (a, with Bill Rude, Chris Wyatt and Kevin Hanna, Arcana Studio, 2009)
House of Mystery Annual #2: "Madame Xanadu" (a, with Matt Wagner, Vertigo, 2011) collected in Volume 7: Conception (tpb, 160 pages, 2012)
Thickness #2: "Dirty Deeds" (w/a, anthology, 2011)
Dark Horse:
 Dark Horse Presents #7: "The Speaker" (w/a, anthology, 2011)
 Empowered: Internal Medicine (a, with Adam Warren, one-shot, 2014) collected in Unchained Volume 1 (tpb, 208 pages, 2015)
Walrus (w/a, collection of sketches, drawings and rare comics from 2009 to 2012, 112 pages, PictureBox, 2013)
The Infinite Corpse: 3 panel contribution (w/a, independent web comic)

Covers only
Hack/Slash: The Series #13 (Devil's Due, 2008)
Snakebomb Comix #1 (Snakebomb, 2011)
Clockwork Girl hc (HarperCollins, 2011)
Elephantmen #43 (Image, 2012)
Orc Stain #8 (Image, 2012)
Godzilla: The Half-Century War #3 (IDW Publishing, 2012)
Burn the Orphanage: Born to Lose #1 (Image, 2013)
Shutter #1 and #25 (Image, 2014 and 2016)
The Wicked + The Divine #8 (Image, 2015)
G.I Joe #3 (IDW Publishing, 2019)
Nomen Omen #4 (Image, 2020)
Bolero #2 (Image, 2022)

Other works 

 Love Is Calling Me (Cover art, music album by Joanna Wang, 2019)

Notes

References

External links

Living people
Artists from Oregon
American comics writers
1976 births
Writers from Oregon